Bladensburg is a small unincorporated community in Wapello County, Iowa, United States. It lies midway between Agency and Batavia at a distance of five miles (8 km) from each, and the largest nearby city is Ottumwa, seven miles (11 km) to the west-southwest.

History
The village of Bladensburg was established in 1853. It had a post office from 1855 to 1906. Bladensburg's population was 82 in 1902, and 39 in 1925.

References

External links
Bladensburg, Iowa — Community Profile
Iowa Ghost Towns
Blandensburg Cemetery

Unincorporated communities in Iowa
Unincorporated communities in Wapello County, Iowa
Populated places established in 1853